The Society for encouraging prosperity, especially among rural people (Maatschappij tot bevordering van Welstand, voornamelijk onder landlieden), later shortened to Society of Prosperity (Maatschappij van Welstand), was a Dutch organisation set up in 1822 by Jacob van Heusden, from Hilvarenbeek.

External links
 Maatschappij van Welstand

Charities based in the Netherlands
19th century in the Netherlands
1822 establishments in the Netherlands